Vyacheslav Gretsky (born December 23, 1996) is a Belarusian professional ice hockey centre. He tried out for HK Neman Grodno of the Belarusian Extraleague in 2021. Since August 23, 2022, he plays for Amur Khabarovsk in the Kontinental Hockey League (KHL).

Playing career
Gretsky made his professional debut for the Kontinental Hockey League's HC Dinamo Minsk in 2019 following a trial and played in 19 regular season games, scoring one goal and two assists. He was voted into the 2020 KHL All-Star Game by fans. He wears the number 99. as did his soundalike, Wayne Gretzky.

References

External links

1996 births
Amur Khabarovsk players
Belarusian ice hockey centres
HC Dinamo Minsk players
HK Lida players
HK Neman Grodno players
Living people
Sportspeople from Grodno